Grass Creek is a stream in the U.S. state of South Dakota.

Grass Creek's name comes from the Sioux Indians of the area, for the thick grass along the stream's watercourse.

See also
List of rivers of South Dakota

References

Rivers of Oglala Lakota County, South Dakota
Rivers of South Dakota